Gracefield Arts Centre is located in Dumfries. The gallery's main building, a Category B listed building, was bought in 1951 by a committee of local people who raised the money needed for the purchase and to do the alterations necessary to change the former house, which was known as ‘Gracefield’ into an art gallery.

The gallery houses a collection of over 600 Scottish paintings which include paintings by the Scottish Colourists, the Glasgow Boys, the Kirkcudbright School and the Edinburgh School, as well as contemporary Scottish works of art by the likes of Joan Eardley and Andy Goldsworthy. The gallery hosts a changing programme of contemporary exhibitions featuring regional, national and international artists and craftmakers.

A wide range of art and craft activities for adults and children run throughout the year at the gallery.

References

External links
 Gracefield Arts Centre at exploreart.co.uk
 Gracefield Arts Centre at Dumfries & Galloway Council website

Art museums and galleries in Dumfries and Galloway
Category B listed buildings in Dumfries and Galloway
Listed houses in Scotland
Listed museum buildings in Scotland
Arts centres in Scotland